Jalalabad (also known as Parashurampuri) is a town near Shahjahanpur City and a municipal board in Shahjahanpur district of the Indian state Uttar Pradesh.

Geography
It has an average elevation of 133 metres (436 feet).

Demographics
As of the 2001 India census, Jalalabad had a population of 31,112. Males constitute 53% of the population and females 49%. Jalalabad has an average literacy rate of 60%, greater than the national average of 59.5%: male literacy is 70%, and female literacy is 51%. In Jalalabad, 15% of the population is under 6 years of age.

References

Cities and towns in Shahjahanpur district